Ilesa East is a Local Government Area in Osun State, Nigeria. Its headquarters are in Iyemogun in the city of Ilesa.

It has an area of  71 km and a population of 106,586 at the 2006 census.

The postal code of the area is 233.

References

Local Government Areas in Osun State